The Eastern Parkway Line is one of the lines of the A Division of the New York City Subway, stretching from Downtown Brooklyn south along Flatbush Avenue and east along Eastern Parkway to Crown Heights. After passing Utica Avenue, the line rises onto an elevated structure and becomes the New Lots Line to the end at New Lots Avenue in East New York, Brooklyn. The west end of the Eastern Parkway Line is at the Joralemon Street Tunnel under the East River.

The IRT Nostrand Avenue Line splits from the local tracks of the Eastern Parkway Line south of the Franklin Avenue station.

History

Contract 2 line 
The Eastern Parkway Line to Atlantic Avenue is part of Contract 2 of the Interborough Rapid Transit Company's plan to construct an extension of the original subway, Contract 1. Contract 2 extended the original line from City Hall in Manhattan to Atlantic Avenue in Brooklyn. The Board of Rapid Transit Commissioners approved the route on September 27, 1900, and the contract was signed on September 11, 1902. Construction commenced on Contract 2 on March 4, 1903. In order to cross the East River, a tunnel had to be constructed. That tunnel, the Joralemon Street Tunnel, was the first underwater subway tunnel connecting Manhattan and Brooklyn. It opened on January 9, 1908, extending the subway from Bowling Green to Borough Hall. Clifford Milburn Holland served as the assistant engineer during the construction of the tunnel. It was added to the U.S. National Register of Historic Places on February 9, 2006.

On April 28, 1908, the IRT formally applied with the New York Public Service Commission for permission to open the final section of the Contract 2 line from Borough Hall to Atlantic Avenue near the Flatbush Avenue LIRR station. The application was approved, and the IRT extension opened on May 1, 1908. With the opening of the IRT to Brooklyn on May 1, 1908, ridership fell off on the BRT's elevated and trolley lines over the Brooklyn Bridge with Brooklyn riders choosing to use the new subway. During the construction of the Brooklyn extension, provisions were made for future subway extensions in Brooklyn by the construction of four tracks between Borough Hall and Atlantic Avenue, and the construction of bellmouths at Fulton Street and Flatbush Avenue, at Flatbush Avenue and Lafayette Avenue, and at Atlantic Avenue and Fourth Avenue.

On May 26, 1908, the IRT applied with the Public Service Commission to build a route connecting with these provisions along Flatbush Avenue from Fulton Street along the Manhattan Bridge, connecting with the IRT Third Avenue Line at Canal Street and Bowery.

Dual Contracts expansion 
In 1913, New York City, the Brooklyn Rapid Transit Company, and the Interborough Rapid Transit Company (IRT) reached an agreement, known as the Dual Contracts, to drastically expand subway service across New York City. As part of Contract 3 of the agreement, between New York City and the IRT, the original subway opened by the IRT in 1904 to City Hall, and extended to Atlantic Avenue in 1908, was to be extended eastward into Brooklyn. The line was to be extended along Flatbush Avenue and Eastern Parkway to Buffalo Street as a four-track subway line, and then along East 98th Street and Livonia Avenue to New Lots Avenue as an elevated two-track line, with provisions for the addition of a third track. In addition, a two-track branch line along Nostrand Avenue branching off east of the Franklin Avenue station was to be constructed. The underground portion of the line became known as the Eastern Parkway Line, or Route 12, while the elevated portion became known as the New Lots Line.  

In addition, as part of Contract 3, the IRT agreed to build a branch of the original subway line south down Seventh Avenue, Varick Street, and West Broadway to serve the West Side of Manhattan. South of Chambers Street, there were to be two branches constructed. One of these branches would turn eastward under Park Place and Beekman Street and down William Street and Old Slip. After going through Lower Manhattan, the second branch would go through a tunnel under the East River before running under Clark and Fulton Streets until a junction at Borough Hall with the existing Contract 2 IRT Brooklyn Line, using a provision meant for a line over the Manhattan Bridge. Construction of the Clark Street Tunnel began on October 12, 1914, using a tunneling shield in conjunction with compressed air. The north tube was holed through on November 28, 1916. At 5,900 feet long, with about 3,100 feet underwater, the tunnel was finally opened for revenue service on April 15, 1919. The opening of the tunnel allowed access to Brooklyn via the IRT from both the East and West Sides of Manhattan.

This line was expanded as a part of the Dual Contracts from Atlantic Avenue east. The IRT Eastern Parkway Line was built as part of Route 12 from 1915 to 1918, from the section east of the Atlantic Avenue station to Utica Avenue and down the Nostrand Avenue Subway to Flatbush Avenue. On August 23, 1920, the Eastern Parkway Line was extended from Atlantic Avenue to Utica Avenue. The new lines would be served by trains from Seventh Avenue. Trains operated via the express track between Atlantic Avenue and Franklin Avenue because of the failure of the contractor to perform work as scheduled on the local stations. On October 10, 1920, the three stations that were not ready to be opened with the rest of the line, at Bergen Street, Grand Army Plaza and Eastern Parkway–Brooklyn Museum, were opened.

Later history 
On February 2, 1948, the platform extensions at Hoyt Street opened, allowing 10-car express trains to board as opposed to only 5-car trains.

In August 1961, the chairman of the New York City Transit Authority, Charles Patterson, announced a $2.5 million project that would get rid of a trouble spot on the line between Nevins Street and Atlantic Avenue that slows service and backs up the IRT Division. The project was projected to take two years long and it would have involved the reconfiguration of the track layout in this area. The platforms at the two stations would be extended to accommodate 10-car trains, as opposed to the eight and nine-car trains that they could platform at the time. The tracks between the two stations would be straightened, removing some of the bend in the tracks, but not removing it entirely. The tracks were to be straightened enough to allow for the running time between the two stations to be cut by one to two minutes.

During the 1964–1965 fiscal year, the platforms at Bergen Street, Grand Army Plaza, Eastern Parkway, Nostrand Avenue and Kingston Avenue were lengthened to 525 feet to accommodate a ten-car train of 51-foot IRT cars.

The MTA announced in October 2020 that it would renovate the Eastern Parkway Line tunnels between Borough Hall and Franklin Avenue. The project was expected to take 33 months. The renovations were announced following two incidents in 2018, when ceilings at the Borough Hall and Atlantic Avenue stations partially collapsed, injuring passengers.

Extent and service
The following services use part or all of the IRT Eastern Parkway Line:

Route description 
The IRT Eastern Parkway Line enters Brooklyn through the Joralemon Street Tunnel from the IRT Lexington Avenue Line and continues to run under the street that the tunnel was named after, until after Borough Hall. East of Adams Street and Boerum Plaza, the IRT Broadway–Seventh Avenue Line merges with the line and it runs under Fulton Street, then turns southeast under Flatbush Avenue, which also has the BMT Brighton Line beneath it. The first station along this segment is Nevins Street, which contains a never used lower level, and then joins Atlantic Avenue–Barclays Center, the end of the oldest section of the line. Between Bergen Street and Grand Army Plaza, the line splits around the BMT Brighton Line.

East of Grand Army Plaza, the line finally moves under its namesake, the first station serving the Brooklyn Museum. The next station is a complex near the Brooklyn Botanic Garden that serves the above ground BMT Franklin Avenue Line and the beginning of the IRT Nostrand Avenue Line, which branches off to the south shortly afterwards at Nostrand Junction. The last three stations are a two-over-two track layout with a platform on each level. Afterwards, the IRT Eastern Parkway Line ends under Ralph Avenue, one block east of its originally intended terminus, whereas the local tracks become the IRT New Lots Line, branching off to the southeast emerging from the ground near Buffalo Avenue at Lincoln Terrace Park. The line was built mostly with two levels, with southbound trains on the upper level, and northbound trains on the lower level to protect the trees in the north median of Eastern Parkway to the greatest extent possible.

Station listing

References

External links

New York City Subway lines
Interborough Rapid Transit Company
Railway lines opened in 1908
Railway tunnels on the National Register of Historic Places
Railway buildings and structures on the National Register of Historic Places in New York City
Buildings and structures on the National Register of Historic Places in New York City
1908 establishments in New York City